Luis Andrew Polonia Almonte (born December 10, 1963) is a former Major League Baseball outfielder and designated hitter. He currently resides in Santiago, in the Dominican Republic, his hometown.

Signed by the Oakland Athletics as an amateur free agent in 1984, Polonia would make his Major League Baseball debut with the Oakland Athletics on April 24, 1987, and appear in his final game on October 1, 2000. He played for two World Series championship teams, winning with the Atlanta Braves in 1995 and the New York Yankees in 2000.

Early life
Polonia was born on December 10, 1963 in the Dominican Republic. He joined the Dominican League at an early age and was known as a strong contact hitter, as well as a below-average defensive outfielder. Though he had good speed, he was not a wise baserunner and led his league in caught stealing a total of five times between the minors and majors. He was also known for his tremendous performance during winter ball. He is one of the top 10 contact hitters in Dominican League history and is the all-time Caribbean series leader in hits, doubles, and runs scored as of 2008.

Career
Throughout his career, Polonia was known as a quick runner and stolen base threat.

Oakland Athletics (1987–1989)
Polonia began his career in 1987 with the Oakland Athletics. He played in 125 games that year hitting .287 with 10 triples and 29 stolen bases. The following year, Polonia played in only 84 games, hitting .292 with 29 steals in 36 attempts. Polonia's strong play helped the Oakland A's reach the postseason and advance to the World Series in 1988. However, Polonia was 1 for 9 in the series as Oakland lost to the Los Angeles Dodgers. In 1989, he was hitting .286 with 13 steals in 17 attempts before being traded to the Yankees.

New York Yankees (1989–1990)
On June 21, 1989, the Athletics traded Polonia, Eric Plunk, and Greg Cadaret to the New York Yankees for Rickey Henderson. During the remainder of the season, he hit .313 with 9 steals. In October, he was sentenced to 60 days in prison after pleading guilty to having sex with a minor that August.

Polonia began the 1990 season with seven hits in his first 22 at-bats. After only 11 games, he was traded to the California Angels for Claudell Washington and Rich Monteleone.

California Angels (1990–1993)

Polonia finished the 1990 season with 128 hits in 381 at-bats. Polonia hit .336 for the Angels in 1991, while attaining a career-high 122 OPS+ as well as tying Nelson Liriano and Lance Johnson for third place with nine triples in the American League, but also led the league in times caught stealing. The following year, his average fell to .286, but he tied Shane Mack for the eighth place in the American League in triples. He had 48 stolen bases but was caught 23 times, leading the league. In 1993, his average fell to .271, but he stole 55 bases, tying Roberto Alomar for second (behind Kenny Lofton), but tied Chad Curtis for the league lead with 24 times caught stealing.

Return to the Yankees (1994–1995) and the World Series with Atlanta
In 1994, he signed as a free agent with the Yankees, hitting .311 in the strike-shortened season. He stole 20 of 32 bases that year, but tied Kenny Lofton and Felix Jose with 12 times caught stealing. When baseball resumed in 1995, he hit .261 before being traded to the Atlanta Braves and provided a boost down the stretch when he was 2 for 5 with 3 RBIs in the NLDS and NLCS, despite playing in a platoon role. In the first game of the 1995 World Series, Polonia drove in Fred McGriff for the game-winning RBI. Overall, he was 4-for-14 with a walk, a double, 3 runs scored, and 4 RBIs as he earned his first World Series ring.

Struggles (1996)
Prior to the season, the Seattle Mariners signed Polonia to a non-guaranteed contract. He was released during spring training. He was soon picked up by the Baltimore Orioles where he played 14 games for the Rochester Red Wings before being called up and hitting .240 over 58 games. He was cut in August and signed with the Braves, where he hit .419 down the stretch, but went 0 for 10 with just one walk that postseason as the Braves fell to the New York Yankees in six games.

Out of MLB
In 1997, he signed with the Tampa Bay Devil Rays, but instead played for the Mexico City Tigres. He led the Mexican League in steals and was second in average. Playing in winter ball that year, he hit .382 with a league-leading 15 doubles and 60 hits. In 1998, he hit .381 with 36 of 45 steals and 82 RBIs. In winter ball, he won the batting title with a .336 average, ahead of Luis Castillo.

Back in the Majors (1999–2000)
Polonia was signed late in the 1999 season by the Detroit Tigers, hitting .324 and slugging 10 home runs in 87 games. In 2000, Polonia hit .273 in 80 games for the Tigers before being released.

Third stint with the Yankees (2000)
On August 3, 2000, Polonia signed with the Yankees after being released by the Detroit Tigers. He served as an outfielder down the stretch while also receiving some time as a designated hitter. In the 2000 American League Division Series, Polonia served as a pinch hitter for Jorge Posada in Game 4, where he recorded a single. He received two at-bats in the 2000 World Series, going 1 for 2 with a single. He retired after the World Series.

Career statistics
In 1,379 games over 12 seasons, Polonia compiled a .293 batting average, 1,417 hits, 728 runs scored, 189 doubles, 70 triples, 36 home runs, 405 RBIs, 321 stolen bases, 369 base on balls, a .342 on-base percentage and a .383 slugging percentage. He posted a .983 fielding percentage at all three outfield positions. In the postseason, he hit .234 (11-for-47) in 17 World Series games and 16 playoff games.

Conviction 
Luis Polonia was found guilty of having sexual intercourse with an underage girl, however the judge postponed sentencing until after the 1989 baseball season. "I made a mistake and I'm really sorry for it," Polonia told the judge before the sentence was imposed. "I'm a human being and anybody can make the mistake I made." Polonia, still with the New York Yankees, was sentenced to 60 days in jail and fined $1,500 on the misdemeanor charge of having sex with a 15-year-old girl. Thomas Doherty, Milwaukee County circuit judge, also ordered Polonia to make a $10,000 contribution to the Sinai Samaritan Medical Center's sexual assault treatment center in Milwaukee. Polonia pleaded no contest to the charge of having sexual intercourse with a child. The Yankees ownership made no comment; however, manager Dallas Green said, "It's a shame to see that happen. It's a personal thing. All you can do is warn people. You can't live their lives."

Post-baseball career 
Polonia currently runs the Polonia Baseball Academy.

In 2016, Polonia was inducted in the Caribbean Baseball Hall of Fame

On May 8, 2020, Polonia's son, former professional baseball player Rodney Polonia, was found dead of an apparent heart attack, aged 27.

See also

 List of Major League Baseball career stolen bases leaders

References

External links
, or Retrosheet

1963 births
Living people
Águilas Cibaeñas players
Atlanta Braves players
Baltimore Orioles players
Baseball players at the 2007 Pan American Games
California Angels players
Detroit Tigers players
Dominican Republic expatriate baseball players in Mexico
Dominican Republic expatriate baseball players in the United States
Huntsville Stars players
Madison Muskies players
Major League Baseball designated hitters
Major League Baseball left fielders
Major League Baseball players from the Dominican Republic
Mexican League baseball left fielders
New York Yankees players
Oakland Athletics players
People from Santiago de los Caballeros
Rochester Red Wings players
Tacoma Tigers players
Tigres del México players
Toledo Mud Hens players
Pan American Games competitors for the Dominican Republic
People convicted of child sexual abuse
Prisoners and detainees of Wisconsin